Discovery Land Company is a Scottsdale, Arizona-based developer and operator of private residential communities and clubs in North America. The company has been called one of the best developers of resort communities by Robb Report Vacation Homes and Luxury Living magazines. In 2010, Discovery Land Company recorded over $600 million in sales. In 2015, the company recorded over $1 billion in sales.

History 
Discovery Land Company was founded in 1994 by Michael S. Meldman with the opening of The Estancia Club in Scottsdale, Arizona, and then the Iron Horse project in Whitefish, Montana. The company has 19 properties in Hawaii, California, Arizona, Nevada, Idaho, Montana, Texas, Tennessee, New York, and North Carolina in the U.S., Los Cabos in Mexico, Great Guana Cay in the Bahamas, and Portugal.

Discovery Land acquired land in 2021 to build Costa Terra south of Lisbon in Portugal.

Opening in 2022, Driftwood Club is a project with a Tom Fazio designed golf course near Austin, Texas.

In 2022, the Two Lewis Road project is an East Quogue, New York property approved under Southampton Town Planning review.

Barbuda Ocean Club, planned to open in 2023, is a project with a Tom Fazio designed golf course on the island of Barbuda.

Philanthropy
The Discovery Land Company Foundation primarily supports children in shelters and in foster care.  The Foundation donates to trusted charities providing the best programs and mentors to assist youth.

External links
 Discovery Land official company web site

References

Companies based in Scottsdale, Arizona